A tribe in anthropology is a human social group. 

Tribe, tribes, Tri.be or the Tribe may also refer to:

Native American tribes or tribal nations
Tribe (Native American) 
List of federally recognized tribes in the United States

Arts, entertainment and media

Film
 Tribes (film), or The Soldier Who Declared Peace, 1970 
 The Tribe (1998 film), a TV drama by Stephen Poliakoff
 The Tribe (2005 film), a short documentary
 The Tribe (2009 film), or After Dusk They Come
 The Tribe (2014 film), a Ukrainian drama
 The Tribe (2018 film), a Spanish comedy

Literature
 Tribe (comics), a short-lived comic series
 Tribe, a 2016 book by Sebastian Junger
 Tribe Magazine, Canada, 1993–2005
 Tribes, a 2002 novel by Arthur Slade
 Tribes: We Need You to Lead Us, a 2008 book by Seth Godin
 The Tribe (novel), by Michael Mohammed Ahmad, 2014
 The Tribe (Monica's Gang), a Brazilian comic strip

Music

Groups 
 Tribe (band), an American alternative rock band
 Tribes (band), a British indie rock group
 The Tribe (dance band), a British Christian music group
 A Tribe Called Quest, or Tribe, an American hip hop group 
 Tri.be, South Korean girlgroup
 Tribe Gaming, a mobile gaming esports organization based in Austin, Texas

Record labels
 Tribe Records, Detroit, U.S.
 Tribe Records (Norway)
 Tr1be Records, UK

Albums
 Tribe (Bernie Taupin album), 1987
  Tribe (Chase & Status album), 2017
 Tribe (Enrico Rava album), 2011
 Tribe (Queensrÿche album), 2003
 Tribe (Sadist album), or the title track
 Tribe (EP), by Soulfly, 1999
 Tribe, part of the 2008 compilation album Songs for Survival
 Tribes (Culture Club album), unreleased
 The Tribe (album), by Caspar Brötzmann, 1987

Songs
 "Tribe" (Soulfly song), by Soulfly, 1999
 "Tribe" (Bas song), 2018
 "The Tribe", a 2013 song by Odd Mob

Television
 Tribe (British TV series), a documentary, 2005–2007
 Tribe (Philippine TV series), 2006–2019
 Tribes (TV series), a soap opera, 1990
 "Tribes", a 2008 episode of NCIS (season 5)
 The Tribe (1999 TV series), a science fiction drama
 The Tribe (2015 TV series), a documentary
 Tribal (TV series), a Canadian drama series which premiered in 2020

Other uses in arts and entertainment
Tribes (play), Nina Raine, 2010
Tribes (video game series)
The Tribe (Tales of the Otori), a fictional organisation

People
 George Tribe (1920–2009), an Australian cricketer
 Laurence Tribe (born 1941), an American law professor and author
 Mark Tribe (born 1966), an American artist

Sports
 William & Mary Tribe, American college athletics teams

Other uses
 Adivasi, the collective term for 'tribal' populations in India
Scheduled Castes and Scheduled Tribes, the legal designation for Adivasi populations
 Tribe (biology), a taxonomic classification in biology
 Tribe (internet), a slang term for an unofficial community of people who share a common interest
 Tribe.net, a former social networking website
 Tribes, administrative divisions of the Tribal Assembly of ancient Rome
 The Tribe (Buzoku), a Japanese counter-cultural group
 Phyle, an ancient Greek term for tribe or clan

See also

 Twelve Tribes (disambiguation)
 Tribalism, organized by, or advocating for, tribes or tribal lifestyles
 Tribe v Tribe, an English trusts law case